Frontier Central High School is located at 4432 Bayview Road in Hamburg, New York. The high school is attended by students in grades 9-12. It is located within the Frontier Central School District. The principal is Mr. Daniel Charland, and the assistant principals are Dr. David Smaczniak, Mr. James Helmicki, and Mrs. Shannon Thurston.

The high school is located in the Southtowns of Western New York. The school had an enrollment of 1,882 students in the 2016-17 school year. It is the 4th largest school in Western New York according to a 2017 Niche Survey. The athletic mascot is a falcon.

History 

Frontier High School was built in 1954 and opened in September 1955, replacing the former Blasdell High School (1843-1955).

The high school has expanded three times. The first expansion was in the early 1990s with an eight-room foreign language education wing. The second expansion was in 1998 with 23 classrooms. The third expansion was in 2013, with the addition of a new library media center and secured vestibule. The renovations were completed in 2014.

Alumni 
Ron Wolfley, a former fullback for the West Virginia Mountaineers and Arizona Cardinals,

Joe Hesketh, a former pitcher for the Montreal Expos, Atlanta Braves and Boston Red Sox

Dave Wohlabaugh, a former center for the New England Patriots, Cleveland Browns and St. Louis Rams,

Jacob Schum, punter for the Green Bay Packers.

See also 
 Hamburg High School (Hamburg, New York)
 Orchard Park High School

References

External links 
Official Website

Public high schools in New York (state)
High schools in Erie County, New York